Palmatine is a protoberberine alkaloid found in several plants including Phellodendron amurense, Coptis Chinensis (Rhizoma coptidis, chinese goldthread) and Corydalis yanhusuo, Tinospora cordifolia (gurjo, heart-leaved moonseed), Tinospora sagittata, Phellodendron amurense (amur cork tree), Stephania yunnanensis.

It is the major component of the protoberberine extract from Enantia chlorantha.

It has been studied for its potential use in the treatment of jaundice, dysentery, hypertension, inflammation, and liver-related diseases.  This compound also has weak in vitro activity against flavivirus.

Pharmacology

Neuroprotective activity 
Palmatine can be used to treat Alzheimer’s disease, mainly by inhibiting the activity of acetylcholinesterase (AChE), butyrylcholinesterase (BChE) and neuraminidase-1 (NA-1). It was found, that the positively charged nitrogen on palmatine binds in the gorge of active sire of AChE.

Research show that palmatine had antidepressant effect. It was achieved by regulating brain catalase levels, monoamine oxidase-A (MAO-A) activity, lipid peroxidation, plasma nitrite and corticosterone levels.

Regulating blood lipid activity 
Palmatine achieved hypoglycemic effects by inducing induction of insulin release and insulin-mimicking activity. In addition, studies found that palmatine also inhibited the activity of lens aldose reductase, sucrase and maltase. In vivo research showed that palmatine reduced serum total cholesterol (TC) and triglycerides (TG) and increased serum high-density lipoprotein cholesterol.

Anticancer activity 
Research showed that palmatine had broad anti-cancer activity. Palmatine had significant growth inhibitory effects on seven human cancer cell lines: 7701QGY, SMMC7721, HepG2, CEM, CEM/VCR, K III and Lewis. In addition, palmatine also had anti-cancer activity on MCF-7, U251, KB, CHOK-1, HT-29 and SiHacell lines. Palmatine induced apoptosis in human skin epithelial carcinoma cells (A431) in a concentration- and time-dependent manner via damaging severely to DNA and inhibiting the activity of Bcl-2 protein. In addition, palmatine can inhibit the proliferation and infiltration of cancer cells.

Antibacterial and antiviral activity 
Palmitine has inhibitory effect on Gram-positive bacteria which is significantly stronger than that on Gram-negative bacteria, and 9-O-substituted palmatine derivatives exhibited stronger antibacterial activity.

Anti-inflammatory activity 
Study showed, that palmatine can decrease the production of pro-inflammatory factors and increase the production of anti-inflammatory factors.

Other pharmacological activity 
Studies showed that palmatine had antioxidant activity, had a protective effect on gastric ulcer, derivatives of palmatine were more effective against ulcerative colitis, including low cytotoxicity tointestinal epithelial cells. In addition, palmatine might have the antiarrhythmic effect, and provideprotection from myocardial ischemia-reperfusion injury.

Toxicity 
A large number of studies have shown that palmatine has a complex effect on the metabolism of enzymes in the liver, and that palmatine has significant DNA toxicity. However, some 9-O-substituted palmatine derivatives exhibited less toxic than palmatine. In addition, palmatine had higher affinity to nucleic acids than serum proteins, which make them suitable candidates for delivery by serum proteins.

See also
 Berberine
 Jatrorrhizine
 Phellodendrine

References

Isoquinoline alkaloids
Quaternary ammonium compounds
Phenol ethers
Isoquinolinoisoquinolines